David Anthony Roberts (born October 22, 1939) is an American actor. He is known for his roles in six Woody Allen movies—most notably Annie Hall—often playing Allen's best friend.

Early life
Roberts was born in Manhattan, New York City, the son of Norma (née Finkelstein), an animator, and CBS radio announcer Ken Roberts. His family is Jewish. He had a sister, Nancy, and is the cousin of late actor Everett Sloane. Roberts attended the High School of Music & Art and Northwestern University, and made his Broadway debut in 1962, with a role in the play Something About a Soldier.

Career

Film
Roberts is best known for his collaborations with Woody Allen. In Annie Hall, he portrayed Alvy Singer's best friend Rob. Other Allen films and/or plays in which he has appeared include both the Broadway and film versions of Play It Again, Sam (directed by Herbert Ross), Radio Days (in which his father had a voice role), Stardust Memories, Hannah and Her Sisters, A Midsummer Night's Sex Comedy, and Woody Allen's segment for The Concert for New York City.

Roberts memorably portrayed the badgering Deputy Mayor Warren LaSalle in The Taking of Pelham One Two Three. He also appeared in the Sidney Lumet films Serpico and Just Tell Me What You Want. Roberts was in the 1983 horror film Amityville 3-D portraying John Baxter, the owner of the infamous possessed house.

Roberts was featured in 2014's The Longest Week opposite Jason Bateman.

Theater
Roberts's Broadway credits include Barefoot in the Park; How Now, Dow Jones; Murder at the Howard Johnson's; Promises, Promises; Sugar (the musical version of the movie Some Like It Hot); The Sisters Rosensweig; They're Playing Our Song; Victor/Victoria; The Tale of the Allergist's Wife; Arsenic and Old Lace; and Cabaret. In 1998 he played Buddy Plummer in Stephen Sondheim's Follies at the Paper Mill Playhouse in New Jersey. In 2007, Roberts returned to Broadway in the roller-disco rock musical Xanadu.

Television and radio
On television, Roberts was the third actor to play Lee Pollock on The Edge of Night. He has appeared in numerous series such as The Carol Burnett Show, Matlock, and Law & Order. In 1977, he starred in the short-lived series Rosetti and Ryan with Squire Fridell.

In 1978, he guest starred on The Love Boat. Roberts and Lauren Tewes's character, cruise ship director Julie McCoy, fall in love but don't pursue a relationship.

He starred (with Penny Fuller, who had played his wife on The Edge of Night) on the ABC comedy The Thorns. (Millee Taggart, who had succeeded Fuller in the role on The Edge of Night was the co-creator and co-producer of the series.) He was a regular performer on the CBS Radio Mystery Theater. Roberts also provides the narration on many of the audiobooks in Stuart Woods's Stone Barrington novels.

Filmography

The Trials of O'Brien (1965) - Charlie
The Edge of Night (1965–1966) - Lee Pollock
A Guide for the Married Man (1969, TV Movie)
Men at Law (1970) - Jack Halbert
The Million Dollar Duck (1971) - Fred Hines
Star Spangled Girl (1971) - Andy Hobart
Play It Again, Sam (1972) - Dick
Serpico (1973) - Bob Blair
The Taking of Pelham One Two Three (1974) - Warren LaSalle
Le Sauvage (1975) - Alex Fox
Annie Hall (1977) - Rob
The Girls in the Office (1979, TV Movie) - Mike Holden
Just Tell Me What You Want (1980) - Mike Berger
Stardust Memories (1980) - Tony
A Midsummer Night's Sex Comedy (1982) - Maxwell
Amityville 3-D (1983) - John Baxter
Key Exchange (1985) - David Slattery
Hannah and Her Sisters (1986) - Norman - Mickey's Ex-partner (uncredited)
Seize the Day (1986) - Bernie Pell
Radio Days (1987) - 'Silver Dollar' Emcee
18 Again! (1988) - Arnie Watson
Fist Fighter (1989)
Law & Order (1991–2010) - Senator Bryce Peterson, Paul Redfield, Nicholas Bennett, Lucas Pollard
Popcorn (1991) - Mr. Davis
Switch (1991) - Arnold Freidkin
Our Sons (1991) - Harry
Apologies to Bunuel (1996) - Steve
Dead Broke (1998) - Walter
The Concert for New York City: "Sounds from a Town I Love" (2001) - Man on Bench
My Best Friend's Wife (2001) - Mr. Epstein
Twelve and Holding (2005) - Doctor
Law & Order: Criminal Intent (2008) - Ziggy Gold
The Longest Week (2014) - Barry the Therapist
Dirty Dancing (2017) - Max Kellerman

References

External links
 
 
 
 Tony Roberts at Internet Off-Broadway Database
 Tony Roberts - Downstage Center interview at American Theatre Wing.org
 Tony Roberts article in The New York Observer

1939 births
Male actors from New York City
American male film actors
American male musical theatre actors
American male stage actors
American male television actors
Jewish American male actors
Living people
People from Manhattan
Northwestern University School of Communication alumni
The High School of Music & Art alumni
American male comedy actors
21st-century American Jews